Büyükbahçeli is a village in the Kızılırmak District of Çankırı Province in Turkey. Its population is 42 (2021).

References

Villages in Kızılırmak District